Ivan William Armes (6 April 1924 - 11 November 2015) was an English professional footballer who played for Norwich City and Exeter City as a left half. After leaving Exeter City he was player-coach at Lowestoft Town.

Sources

References

1924 births
English footballers
Norwich City F.C. players
Exeter City F.C. players
2015 deaths
Association football wing halves